The women's individual compound archery competition at the 2019 Summer Universiade was held in the Partenio Stadium, Avellino, Italy and the Royal Palace in Caserta, Italy between July 8 and 13.

Records 
Prior to the competition, the world and Universiade records were as follows.

50 metres Round

15 arrow Match

Qualification round 

The qualification round took place on 9 July 2019 to determine the seeding for the elimination rounds. It consisted of two rounds of 36 arrows, with a maximum score of 720.

Elimination rounds 
Source

Section 1

Section 2

Section 3

Section 4

Final Round

References 

Women's individual compound